The Mayfield classification is a system of categorizing perilunate dislocations.

Classification

References

External links

Orthopedic classifications
Injuries of wrist and hand